Alexander Dunne (born 11 November 2005) is an Irish racing driver currently competing in the Italian F4 Championship for US Racing. He won the 2022 F4 British Championship for Hitech Grand Prix.

Career

Karting 
Dunne began karting at the age of eight, taking a number of victories in local competitions. He would then progress to national competitions in 2015, winning the Motorsport Ireland 'IRL' and '0' Plates and also taking home the Ironside Trophy. That year he would also make his first competitive appearance outside of Ireland, racing in the Super 1 National Championship in the United Kingdom. Following two years of competing on the British Isles, Dunne started racing in mainland Europe in 2018. He would stay in European karting until 2020, with his highlight being winning the WSK Champions Cup in 2019.

Formula 4

2021 
Dunne made his single-seater racing debut in 2021, racing for Pinnacle Motorsport in the F4 Spanish Championship. His season started out in positive fashion, as he scored a pole position on debut and, having fallen back to fifth owing to a poor start, finished third in his first ever race. However, following just three rounds him and the team parted ways, leaving the Irishman 16th in the overall standings by season's end.

It was announced in September of the same year that Dunne would be joining US Racing as part of their ADAC F4 Championship line-up. At his first round at the Hockenheimring, the Irish driver picked up two second places, with his next appearance at the track yielding a pair of pole positions. He finished eighth in the standings, beating a number of full-time competitors.

2022 

At the beginning of 2022, Dunne competed in the F4 UAE Championship for Hitech GP in preparation for his European campaign. He would achieve his first ever win in car racing at the Dubai Autodrome through unusual circumstances, as, during a red flag, all drivers bar Dunne parked up in the pitlane instead of the start/finish straight, giving them all a five-second penalty. Despite being overtaken by Andrea Kimi Antonelli at the restart, the Irishman remained closely behind the Italian to take victory. He would win another race during the final round of the championship, as he finished sixth in the standings.

For his European season, Dunne stayed with US Racing to compete in the Italian F4 Championship, partnering Kacper Sztuka, Marcus Amand, Pedro Perino and Nikhil Bohra. In the first round of the campaign at Imola, Dunne amassed a triple of podiums, having overtaken PHM Racing's Nikita Bedrin in the dying embers of Race 1 to pick up second place and having stormed to the front in Race 2, holding off a fast-charging Rafael Câmara until the checkered flag. Despite losing control of the car in Race 3 after hitting a sausage kerb on lap one, the Irishman was able to recover to third. However, despite a podium at Misano and another one at Spa-Francorchamps, he would be shuffled out of the top two in the championship, being overtaken by Prema drivers Rafael Câmara and Andrea Kimi Antonelli. The Irishman came back to winning ways at the Red Bull Ring, taking two victories and an additional podium, thus narrowing the gap to his two competitors. However, despite three second-placed finishes in the remaining two events, Dunne would have to settle for second in the standings, with Antonelli having attained an unassailable lead during the season finale.

During the same year, Dunne also raced in the British F4 series with Hitech. He started his season out in commanding fashion, winning the pair of main races at the season opener at Donington Park, whilst taking second in the reversed-grid race. The following round at Brands Hatch would provide mixed results, as, despite a dominant win in Race 1, Dunne ended up finishing out of the points in both other races. Round 3 at the Thruxton Circuit would once again bring success, with the Irishman winning races 1 and 3 and extending his championship lead, having experienced a hard battle with Carlin driver Ugo Ugochukwu on Saturday. Dunne once again won the opening race at the next round held at Oulton Park, but he would only finish third in Race 3, having lost out to Louis Sharp and Oliver Gray at the start. The Irish driver experienced a difficult start to the event at Croft, finishing seventh in Race 1, although Dunne was able to take advantage from a stall by poleman Georgi Dimitrov in Race 2 to take victory. In Sunday's main race, which Dunne started from tenth, he clawed his way back to third place by the checkered flag, with his closest championship rival Gray closing the gap between the pair by winning the race. After a less successful round at Knockhill, Dunne bounced back with a pair of victories in the main races at Snetterton and Thruxton respectively, thus setting a new record for most victories in a single British F4 season. At the penultimate round in Silvestone, Dunne finished on the podium in Race 1 despite being involved in a collision with Gray, and took another third place in the final race of the event. Despite missing the final round, instead having chosen to complete his campaign in Italian F4, Dunne was crowned champion at the final weekend, with his points gap having been insurmountable.

GB3 
For the 2023 season, Dunne progressed to the GB3 Championship, returning to Hitech Grand Prix. At the beginning of his season, he will compete in the 2023 Formula Regional Middle East Championship with Hitech Grand Prix, for the final two rounds.

Personal life 
He is the son of Noel Dunne, a former racing driver who won the Irish Formula Ford F1600 series on two occasions.

Karting record

Karting career summary

Complete CIK-FIA Karting European Championship results 
(key) (Races in bold indicate pole position) (Races in italics indicate fastest lap)

Racing record

Racing career summary

Complete ADAC Formula 4 Championship results 
(key) (Races in bold indicate pole position) (Races in italics indicate fastest lap)

Complete F4 UAE Championship results 
(key) (Races in bold indicate pole position) (Races in italics indicate fastest lap)

Complete F4 British Championship results 
(key) (Races in bold indicate pole position) (Races in italics indicate fastest lap)

*Season still in progress.

Complete Italian F4 Championship results 
(key) (Races in bold indicate pole position) (Races in italics indicate fastest lap)

Complete GB3 Championship results 
(key) (Races in bold indicate pole position) (Races in italics indicate fastest lap)

* Season still in progress.

References

External links 

2005 births
Living people
Irish racing drivers
British F4 Championship drivers
Hitech Grand Prix drivers
Italian F4 Championship drivers
ADAC Formula 4 drivers
Spanish F4 Championship drivers
Pinnacle Motorsport drivers
US Racing drivers
KCMG drivers
Karting World Championship drivers
UAE F4 Championship drivers